Aadukalam is a 2011 Indian Tamil-language drama film directed by Vetrimaran, who also co-wrote the screenplay and dialogues with Vikram Sugumaran from his story. Produced by Five Star Kathiresan and distributed by Sun Pictures, the film stars Dhanush and Taapsee Pannu (in her film debut), with Kishore, V. I. S. Jayapalan, Naren Narayanan, and Murugadoss in supporting roles. G. V. Prakash Kumar composed the film score and soundtrack.

The film was released on 14 January 2011 to critical acclaim, with critics praising the screenplay, direction and performances(particularly of Dhanush, Jayapalan and Naren). The film won six awards at the 58th National Film Awards, including Best Director, Best Screenplay and Best Actor. The film also won five awards at the 59th Filmfare Awards South – Best Film, Best Director, Best Actor, Best Music Director and Best Cinematography. Based on an online poll by The Times of India, Vetrimaran was chosen as the best director for Aadukalam.

Plot 
In Madurai, veteran rooster trainer Periyasamy aka "Pettaikaaran" and Madurai Central Police Inspector Rathnaswamy are tough competitors in cockfights, and it is often Pettai who wins because nobody knows his way of maintaining the quality of the birds. Rathnasamy and Pettai were once protegees of grand veteran Doraisamy, who has retired from active competition but is the overlord of rooster fighting in South Tamil Nadu.

K. P. Karuppu and Durai are the favourites in Pettai's team. Karuppu is very talented in breeding and training roosters, while Durai is very rich, owns three bars in the town of Thiruparankundram, and is talented in cock training. Rathnaswamy keeps insisting on having one last fight to win and satisfy his old mother's wish, but Pettai declines to have any more fights with him because he feels that Rathnaswamy has lost faith in his roosters and will be using nefarious methods to win. Rathnaswamy keeps insisting and tries to make him accept the challenge through cajoling, threatening, bribing, and other vile acts.

Karuppu falls in love with an Anglo-Indian girl named Irene, who dislikes him. He does not recognize this initially and keeps following her. One day, the residents of Irene's colony confront him and ask Irene to tell who she is in love with – Karuppu or Dinesh, another man in the locality. She points her finger at Karuppu, and he goes into rapture. She explains later that she had to lie in order to avoid Dinesh, who has been bothering her for a long time. Later, Irene too falls in love with Karuppu.

Meanwhile, Rathnasamy tries to cajole Ayub, Pettai's veterinarian for roosters, to get Pettai to come for a competition against himself, in exchange for a heavy amount. Ayub refuses and insults Rathnasamy. The same night, Ayub is killed in a hit and run accident. Durai initially suspects Rathnaswamy, and all of Pettai's gang wants revenge, but Pettai decides to conduct a state tournament in Ayub's name and provide his family with funds so that Ayub's poor daughters can be married. He asks permission from Rathnasamy as the police have to permit it, but Rathnaswamy refuses, manhandles, and berates Pettai as a thief. In a rage, Pettai, suspecting Rathnaswamy of the murder, agrees to the one-on-one rooster fight that Rathnaswamy has been asking for so long. He bets that he will field his roosters against every rooster that Rathnaswamy brings to the field in the following tournament, and even if one of Pettai's roosters loses against Rathnaswamy's, Pettai will tonsure his head and face, publicly apologize to him, and will quit rooster fights. If Rathnaswamy is not able to beat at least one of his roosters, the same conditions will be applied on him, at the end of the day. Finally getting his way, Rathnaswamy permits the tournament.

The grand state tournament is arranged by Pettai's team, getting heavy funds and official permission. In the initial 11 fights, Rathnasamy's roosters are defeated by Pettai's. Rathnasamy brings high-bred roosters from Bangalore and enters them into the tournament. Seeing the quality of new roosters, Karuppu asks Pettai to let his rooster fight, but Pettai puts his rooster down and says that he will choose the best competing rooster himself. Karuppu surreptitiously enters the contest as Pettai's team before Pettai can choose the rooster because he needs to repay Irene for the loan he took to prepare his rooster for the fight. Pettai does not believe in Karuppu and his rooster announces that Karuppu will not represent Pettai, and the result of Karuppu's match will not be acknowledged by his team. However, the 'underdog' emerges victorious in three consecutive rounds, despite facing roosters spiked with steroids.

While initially happy that Karuppu won, Pettai is soon overcome with anger and jealousy. His ego is hurt by the fact that Karuppu earns both popularity and money, by refuting his judgement. Karuppu is not aware of the changes in Pettai's mind. Pettai is at first refusing to speak to anyone and then starts scheming. Karuppu gives Pettai the money from the competition for safekeeping, which he plans to use to start a business, but it goes missing. Pettai also starts spinning stories about his associates and makes everyone suspicious of each other. He incites Karuppu and Durai into pitting their roosters in a fight. Meanwhile, Karuppu's mother dies from the shock of losing all the money. Pettai poisons Durai's roosters, making him suspect Karuppu, who is arrested for this. Pettai then lies to Irene that his wife was in an adulterous relationship with Karuppu. Irene's family also pressures her to move to Chennai, which pushes her into attempting suicide. Pettai, meanwhile, calls Karuppu to a location near a temple and informs Durai about his whereabouts. When Irene recovers, she calls Karuppu and informs him that Pettai is badmouthing him, so Karuppu goes to find Pettai and confront him. Karuppu finds that Pettai was the one who stole his money, and a guilt-ridden Pettai kills himself. Karuppu does not wish to reveal the fact to the public that Pettai stole his money and schemed against him, so he flees with Irene to start a new life in another city, leaving the money with his friend.

Cast 

Dhanush as K. P. Karuppu
Taapsee Pannu as Irene Claude (Voiceover by Andrea Jeremiah)
Kishore as Durai
V. I. S. Jayapalan as Periyasamy/Pettaikaran 
Naren Narayanan as Rathnasamy
Murugadoss as Oole
Meenal as Meena
Sendrayan as Nicholas
Periya Karuppu Thevar as Ayub
Jayaprakash as Irene's relative
Dinesh Ravi as Dinesh
Halwa Vasu as Speaker
 Munnar Ramesh
Velraj as Police Inspector (special appearance)

Production

Development 

Following the success of their 2007 collaboration Polladhavan, the entire team of that film  director Vetrimaaran, lead actor Dhanush, producer S. Kathiresan, and music director G. V. Prakash Kumar  collaborated again for Aadukalam. Vetrimaaran spent a period of two years in Madurai to understand the local dialect and lifestyle of the people living there. Aadukalam was the first film of Vetrimaaran to have a production office set up outside of Chennai. Vetrimaaran took a year to complete the screenplay, script, and dialogues for Aadukalam and held a bounded script for the venture, which is considered rare in Tamil films. Vetrimaaran narrated only half of the film's script to Dhanush before the latter was impressed with it and agreed to act in the film. The film was initially titled Seval, but since the rights to the title were already taken by director Hari for his project with Bharath, Vetrimaaran decided to rename his film as Aadukalam. Vetrimaaran revealed that the idea of the story was inspired from several international films such as, Caché, Amores perros, Babel, Tamil films Thevar Magan, Virumaandi, Paruthiveeran and novels Roots: The Saga of an American Family and Shantaram, which mentioned during the end credits.

Casting 
Shriya Saran was signed on for the project in February 2008 but eventually pulled out citing schedule conflicts. In April 2008, it was reported that Dhanush too had walked out of the project due to schedule issues, and that Silambarasan was set to replace him. However, Dhanush remained and continued with the film. Subsequently, in June 2009, Trisha Krishnan, who was selected to replace Saran for the role of Irene, was forced to opt out of the project after her schedule clashed with the allotted dates for her other films, Namo Venkatesa (2010) and Vinnaithaandi Varuvaayaa (2010). Newcomer Taapsee Pannu, a Punjabi software engineer, was named as her replacement. Sri Lankan Tamil writer and political commentator V. I. S. Jayapalan portrayed the role of Karuppu's mentor, Pettaikaran, thereby making his debut in Tamil cinema. Attakathi Dinesh makes a small cameo in the film as Dinesh, Karuppu's nemesis when it comes to winning Irene's love. Murugadoss plays Karuppu's friend Oole while Naren appears as Rathnasamy who is also Pettaikaran's rival in cockfighting.

Filming 
Principal photography began in Madurai in February 2009 with scenes featuring Dhanush being shot. The first look of the film was released shortly after the commencement of filming. It featured a series of promotional posters depicting the characters played by Dhanush, Jayapalan and Kishore. During early stages of production, Dhanush revealed he would play the role of a local cockfighter named K. P. Karuppu, and described the venture as his "dream project". The cockfight sequences that take place before intermission was filmed for 26 days in a set created by art director Jacki. Filming was completed in August 2010. In addition to being shot in Madurai, some portions were also filmed in Thiruparankundram. The cockfights were filmed using computer-generated imagery (CGI).

Post Production 
The post-production works on the cockfight sequences delayed the film's release. The voices for Kishore, Taapsee, and Jayapalan were dubbed by Samuthirakani, Andrea Jeremiah and Radha Ravi respectively.

Music 

G. V. Prakash Kumar's soundtrack consists of seven tracks including two rap numbers performed by Malaysian Tamil rapper Yogi B. It was released by Sony Music and the audio was launched at a small function at Lady Aandal School auditorium in Chennai on 1 December 2010. The song Yathe Yathe topped the charts and remained in the No.1 position for nearly five weeks.

Reception

Critical reception 
The film received critical acclaim from critics and audiences, praising the direction, screenplay and performances (particularly Dhanush, Jayapalan and Naren) and music. Sify called it "a gutsy and brilliant film" and mentioned that it " lives up to the expectation that the film carried and the credit goes to Vetrimaran whose research and hard work shows on screen". Behindwoods wrote "Aadukalam is an attempt that requires appreciation where the director has hacked his way through the path less trodden with aplomb". Karthik Subramanian of The Hindu praised the film stating that "The detailing of every characters in the story is intricate. The narrative moves like a good novel where the first few chapters are all about etching and detailing the players, and the plot and the action unfold much later". Pavithra Srinivasan of Rediff.com called it "one of Dhanush's best works to date". Tamil magazine Ananda Vikatan rated the film with 44 marks and mentioned that "This arena is new for presenting cultural nuances of a region and changes in human emotions beautifully".

Box office 
The film had a theatrical run of 50 weeks in 4 theatre centres.

Accolades 

Aadukalam won six awards at the 58th National Film Awards ceremony, thereby sharing the record with Kannathil Muthamittal (2002) for the most National Film Awards won by a Tamil film. It won awards under the Best Direction (Vetrimaaran), Best Actor (Dhanush), Best Screenplay (Original) (Vetrimaaran), Best Editing (Kishore Te) and Best Choreography (Dinesh Kumar) categories with a Special Jury Award being presented to V. I. S Jayapalan. The film was nominated in seven categories at the 59th Filmfare Awards South, winning Best Film – Tamil (S. Kathiresan), Best Director – Tamil (Vetrimaaran), Best Actor – Tamil (Dhanush), Best Music Director – Tamil (G. V. Prakash Kumar), and Best Cinematographer (Velraj). At the 6th Vijay Awards, it was nominated in twenty-two categories and won in five, including Entertainer of the Year (Dhanush), Best Director (Vetrimaaran) and Best Music Director (G. V. Prakash Kumar). Among other wins, the film received seven Ananda Vikatan Cinema Awards, four South Indian International Movie Awards, three Mirchi Music Awards, and one Norway Tamil Film Festival Award, Chennai International Film Festival Award, and Chennai Times Film Award each.

Notes

References

Sources

External links 
 

2011 drama films
Indian drama films
Indian sports films
Films featuring a Best Actor National Award-winning performance
Films whose director won the Best Director National Film Award
2011 films
Films shot in Madurai
Tamil films remade in other languages
Films scored by G. V. Prakash Kumar
2010s Tamil-language films
Films whose editor won the Best Film Editing National Award
Films featuring a Best Choreography National Film Award-winning choreography
Films whose writer won the Best Original Screenplay National Film Award
2010s sports films
Cockfighting in film
Films directed by Vetrimaaran